Alan Healey Brice (October 1, 1937 – July 30, 2016) was a pitcher in Major League Baseball who played for the Chicago White Sox in its 1961 season.

References

External links
, or Baseball Almanac, or Retrosheet

1937 births
2016 deaths
Atlanta Crackers players
Buffalo Bisons (minor league) players
Chicago White Sox players
Dallas Rangers players
Davenport DavSox players
Denver Bears players
Dubuque Packers players
Duluth-Superior White Sox players
Holdrege White Sox players
Indianapolis Indians players
Lincoln Chiefs players
Major League Baseball pitchers
People from Bradenton, Florida
San Diego Padres (minor league) players
Baseball players from New York City